The 2005 WNBA season was the ninth for the Los Angeles Sparks. Despite making the playoffs, they played mediocre basketball all season long, and they were not considered a playoff factor, as they were swept in the Conference Semifinals to eventual champion Sacramento Monarchs.

Offseason

WNBA Draft

Regular season

Season standings

Season schedule

Playoffs

Player stats

References

External links
Sparks on Basketball Reference

Los Angeles Sparks seasons
Los Angeles
Los Angeles Sparks